Cass Township is the name of eight townships in the U.S. state of Indiana:

 Cass Township, Clay County, Indiana
 Cass Township, Dubois County, Indiana
 Cass Township, Greene County, Indiana
 Cass Township, LaPorte County, Indiana
 Cass Township, Ohio County, Indiana
 Cass Township, Pulaski County, Indiana
 Cass Township, Sullivan County, Indiana
 Cass Township, White County, Indiana

Indiana township disambiguation pages